Laura Mason (1957–2021) was a British food historian based in York. She studied home economics and food technology and published several books on cookery and its history.

Early life and education
Mason was born in Ilkley on 7 August 1957 and attended Ilkley Grammar School. Her father was a farmer and her mother a local historian. She took a foundation course at Bradford College of Art and a degree in home economics and a further degree in food technology at Leeds Polytechnic.

Career
In 1997 Mason co-authored The Taste of Britain with Catherine Brown, published by Harper-Collins with a foreword by Hugh Fearnley-Whittingstall.

She published Sugar-Plums and Sherbert: a Prehistory of Sweets in 1998. As Alan Davidson's research assistant she wrote many of the articles in The Oxford Companion to Food (1999). She wrote several books for the National Trust: Farmhouse Cookery in 2005, and Book of Crumbles and Book of Afternoon Tea both in 2018, and Roasts in 2019. Her other publications included Sweets and Candy (2019) and Pine, about pine trees, in 2013.

Personal life
Mason lived in York after moving there in 1976. She married Ian Tomlin, who died in 1982, and in 2012 married Derek Johnson. She died of cancer on 2 February 2021.

Selected publications

References

1957 births
2021 deaths
Food historians
British women historians
People from Ilkley
People from York
People educated at Ilkley Grammar School